Geoff Hammond competed for Canada in the men's standing volleyball event at the 2000 Summer Paralympics, where he won a silver medal.

See also 
 Canada at the 2000 Summer Paralympics

References

External links 
 
 Geoff Hammond at World ParaVolley

Living people
Year of birth missing (living people)
Place of birth missing (living people)
Canadian men's volleyball players
Paralympic silver medalists for Canada
Paralympic medalists in volleyball
Volleyball players at the 2000 Summer Paralympics
Medalists at the 2000 Summer Paralympics
Paralympic volleyball players of Canada